Lake Oponona is a natural lake in the Uuvudhiya Constituency in the Oshana Region of northern Namibia.

It holds water up to the following rainy season in a prosperous year. Because the lake maintains water for a long time a number of birds like flamingos and others temporarily move there when the oshanas (flood plains), swamps, and other wetlands dry up.

During the 2012/2013 drought Lake Oponona shrank by more than  due to thousands of cattle that were moved there to drink.

There is also Oponona River situated at Oniizimba village of Ompundja Constituency.

References

Oponona
Oshana Region
Ramsar sites in Namibia
Oshiwambo words and phrases